The Colorado Springs, CO, Metropolitan Statistical Area is a United States Office of Management and Budget defined Metropolitan Statistical Area (MSA) located in the Colorado Springs region of the State of Colorado. The 2020 United States census counted a population of 755,105, an increase of 17.0% since the 2010 United States Census. The Colorado Springs MSA is the 79th-most populous MSA in the United States. The Colorado Springs MSA encompasses El Paso County and Teller County, Colorado. Approximately 88.40% percent of the MSA's population live in cities or CDPs. The Colorado Springs Metropolitan Statistical Area is the second-most populous component of the Front Range Urban Corridor.

Metropolitan Area Cities and Towns

Unincorporated communities
Altman 
Cascade
Crystola
Falcon
Rush
Truckton 
Yoder

See also

El Paso County, Colorado
Teller County, Colorado
Colorado census statistical areas
Colorado metropolitan areas
Combined Statistical Area
Core Based Statistical Area
Micropolitan Statistical Area
Table of United States Combined Statistical Areas
Table of United States Metropolitan Statistical Areas
Table of United States Micropolitan Statistical Areas
Table of United States primary census statistical areas
Larger urban regions that contain the Colorado Springs Metropolitan Statistical Area:
Front Range Urban Corridor
South Central Colorado Urban Area
Census statistical areas adjacent to Colorado Springs Metropolitan Statistical Area:
Cañon City Micropolitan Statistical Area
Denver-Aurora Metropolitan Statistical Area
North Central Colorado Urban Area
Pueblo Metropolitan Statistical Area

References

Metropolitan areas of Colorado